Pataveh-ye Kari (also Romanized as Pātāveh-ye Karī; also known as Pātāveh) is a village in Poshteh-ye Zilayi Rural District, Sarfaryab District, Charam County, Kohgiluyeh and Boyer-Ahmad Province, Iran. At the 2006 census, its population was 103, in 17 families.

References 

Populated places in Charam County